The Volkswagen Atlas is a mid-size crossover SUV manufactured by the German automaker Volkswagen since 2017. Developed mainly for the North American and Chinese market, the vehicle is based on the Volkswagen Group MQB platform. Outside the US and Canadian markets, the vehicle is marketed as the Volkswagen Teramont. It is positioned above the long-wheelbase Tiguan and below the smaller but upscale Touareg.

Overview 
The Atlas is marketed as the Teramont outside North America and Chile, including the Middle East (except Israel, where it's sold as the Atlas),  Africa, as well as in Mexico, Russia, Colombia and China, where production in Ningbo began in 2017. For markets outside China, the Atlas/Teramont is produced in the Chattanooga plant in Chattanooga, Tennessee, United States.

The vehicle features a transverse mounted four-cylinder or Volkswagen's VR6 engine. Up to the introduction of the China-only Talagon, the Atlas is the largest vehicle produced on the Volkswagen Group MQB platform.

Markets

North America (Atlas) 
The CrossBlue previewed the Atlas/Teramont as a concept diesel plug-in-hybrid mid-size crossover SUV in September 2013. The Atlas was introduced at the LA Auto Show in Los Angeles on November 17, 2016. The name Atlas was picked for the region after the proposed Teramont name was rejected by dealers. It went on sale in the United States and Canada in May 2017 as a 2018 model year.

Engines 
The Atlas has two gasoline engine options in the United States.

Safety 
The 2018 Atlas received the IIHS "Top Safety Pick" rating after earning "Good" ratings in all five crashworthiness tests, and a "Superior" rating on the front crash prevention test. This was in January 2018.

Facelift 
At the 2020 Chicago Auto Show, Volkswagen unveiled the refreshed Atlas for the model year of 2021. Changes include a new front end, which is based on the Atlas Cross Sport, redesigned wheels, new rear lights, and a new steering wheel. It was facelifted for Mexico on December 1, 2020, alongside the introduction of the Teramont Cross Sport.

China (Teramont) 
In China, the Teramont was unveiled at the 2016 Guangzhou Auto Show. The Teramont is made in China by the SAIC-Volkswagen joint venture for the Chinese market. The Volkswagen Teramont is available with an  2.0-liter TSI, a  2.0-liter TSI, or with a  2.5-liter VR6. All variants are paired to a 7-speed DSG with the 4MOTION all-wheel drive system. The 2.0-liter engines are locally manufactured in China, while the VR6 engine is manufactured in Germany and shipped over to the factory in Shanghai. It was developed specifically for the Chinese market where engines above 3.0 liters are subject to heavy excise tax.

Engines

Facelift 
At the 2021 Shanghai Auto Show, Volkswagen unveiled the refreshed Teramont for the model year of 2021 in China. Changes include a new front end, redesigned wheels, and new full-width rear lights. It was introduced alongside the introduction of the Teramont X 2021 facelift.

Two-row versions 
The Atlas Cross Sport (called Teramont X in China and Teramont Cross Sport in Mexico) is a smaller variation of the Atlas/Teramont. The 4.97 meter long vehicle has the same wheelbase (2.98 meters) as the three-row model, but has a lower roof and angled rear window to give it a sportier appearance and is only available with two rows of seating instead of three.

North America (Atlas Cross Sport) 
The Atlas Cross Sport debuted in North America in early 2020, as a new model for the 2020 model year. Available engines are the same as the original Atlas: a turbocharged four-cylinder and a VR6. The Atlas Cross Sport is offered in S, SE, SEL, SEL R-Line, SEL Premium, and SEL Premium R-Line trims. The Cross Sport was previewed by the concept CrossBlue Coupe in September 2013. This Atlas Cross Sport, known in Mexico as the Teramont Cross Sport, was introduced for the Mexican market on December 1, 2020, alongside the facelifted Teramont. It is only sold in the Highline trim level and it is equipped with the R-Line aerodynamic kit.

China (Teramont X) 
The Teramont X was unveiled in April 2019 in 2019 Shanghai Auto Show. It positioned as a coupé version of the Teramont in the Chinese market. The engine options is also shared with the standard Teramont, however all Teramont X models have four-wheel drive as standard. It features a different front fascia compared to the North American Atlas Cross Sport. The Teramont X in China received a facelift for the 2021 model year, and debuted alongside the Teramont 2021 model year facelift.

Production and sales

References

External links 

 
  (Cross Sport)

Atlas
Cars introduced in 2017
2020s cars
Mid-size sport utility vehicles
Crossover sport utility vehicles
Front-wheel-drive vehicles
All-wheel-drive vehicles
Cars powered by VR engines